Mount Elgon is an extinct shield volcano on the border of Uganda and Kenya, north of Kisumu and west of Kitale. The mountain's highest point, named "Wagagai", is located entirely within Uganda. Although there is no verifiable evidence of its earliest volcanic activity, geologists estimate that Mount Elgon is at least 24 million years old, making it the oldest extinct volcano in East Africa. The mountain's name originates from its Maasai name, Elgonyi.

Physical features

Mount Elgon is a massive solitary volcanic mountain on the border of eastern Uganda and western Kenya. Its cooler heights offer respite for humans from the hot plains below, and its higher altitudes provide a refuge for flora and fauna.

Mt. Elgon consists of five major peaks:
 Wagagai , in Uganda
 Sudek    on the Kenya/Uganda border
 Koitobos, a flat-topped basalt column in Kenya
 Mubiyi   in Uganda
 Masaba 	 in Uganda

Other features of note are:
 The caldera — Elgon's is one of the largest intact calderas in the world.
 The warm springs by the Suam River
 Endebess Bluff
The cave contains salt deposits and it is frequented by wild elephants that lick the salt exposed by gouging the walls with their tusks. It became notorious following the publication of Richard Preston's book The Hot Zone in 1994 for its association with the Marburg virus after two people who had visited the cave (one in 1980 and another in 1987) contracted the disease and died.

The mountain soils are red laterite. The mountain is the catchment area for the several rivers such as the Suam River, which becomes the Turkwel downstream and drains into Lake Turkana, and the Nzoia River and the Lwakhakha River, which flow to Lake Victoria. The town of Kitale is in the foothills of the mountain. The area around the mountain is protected by two Mount Elgon National Parks, one on each side of the international border.

Fauna 
A unique population of African bush elephants is present around the mountain that venture deep into caves to access salt licks. This population was formerly present around all the mountain, but has since been reduced to the Kenyan side, where they venture into Kitum Cave.

There are several disjunct populations of mammal species that are restricted to Mount Elgon, including the Elgon shrew (Crocidura elgonius), Rudd's mole-rat (Tachyoryctes ruddi), and Thomas's pygmy mouse (Mus sorella). There are also several disjunct populations of rare bird species, including Sharpe's longclaw (Macronyx sharpei), Hunter's cisticola (Cisticola hunteri), Jackson's spurfowl (Pternistis jacksoni), and the Elgon francolin (Scleroptila elgonensis).

An endemic subspecies of the bushbuck (Tragelaphus scriptus heterochrous) is restricted to the mountain. The possibly extinct Du Toit's torrent frog (Arthroleptides dutoiti), considered an EDGE species due to its evolutionary distinctiveness, is known only from a single specimen collected on the Kenyan side of the mountain.

Flora

Some rare plants are found on the mountain, including  Ardisiandra wettsteinii, Carduus afromontanus, Echinops hoehnelii, Ranunculus keniensis, and Romulea keniensis.

Local ethnicities
Mount Elgon and its tributaries are home to four tribes, the Bagisu, the Sapinjek, the Sabaot, and the Ogiek, better known in the region under the derogatory umbrella term Ndorobo.

Gallery

See also
 List of Ultras of Africa
 2010 Ugandan landslide
 List of volcanoes in Kenya
 Elgon languages
 Mount Elgon insurgency
 Breast shaped hills

References

External links 

 Kenya Wildlife Service – Mount Elgon National Park
 Mt. Elgon Caves
 Mount Elgon National Park

 
Bungoma County
Trans-Nzoia County
Volcanoes of Kenya
Calderas of Africa
Calderas of Kenya
Mountains of Uganda
Volcanoes of Uganda
Mountains of Kenya
Volcanoes of the Great Rift Valley
Extinct volcanoes
Kenya–Uganda border
International mountains of Africa
Four-thousanders of Africa
East African montane forests
Miocene shield volcanoes